Santry is a suburb on the northside of Dublin, Ireland, bordering Coolock, Glasnevin, Kilmore and Ballymun. It straddles the boundary of Dublin City Council and Fingal County Council jurisdictions.

The character of the area has changed in the last 100 years, from a district centred on a large estate, and later a small village, to a modern, rather dispersed, mixed-use suburb. Much of the old village is gone and where there were once fields full of crops, and wild woodlands of all sorts, there are now housing estates, an athletics stadium, a shopping complex, industrial parks, and busy roads leading to Dublin Airport which is nearby.

Trinity College Library has a depository at Santry which holds three million books.

Santry is also the name of a civil parish in the ancient barony of Coolock.

History
Santry is an anglicisation of the Irish placename Seantrabh  (pronounced Shan-treev) which literally means "old tribe". Although not verified, the book of Leccan refers to a tribe called the Almanii who inhabited the area, which might have been the source of the name.

During the Viking invasions a number of peaceful Norse farmers moved into the north Dublin area, which proved to be excellent farmland. These Norsemen were famous for their agricultural prowess, and crafts. They also brought new pastimes and strange Scandinavian phrases which are thought to survive to today further away from the city.

After this time people began to refer to the area north of the River Tolka, including from Santry and north to Swords, Lusk, and beyond as "Fingal", which translates as "fair-haired foreigner". The name was confined to songs, poems, folk memory and some antiquarian titles until a re-organization of local government in the 1990s set up Fingal and Fingal County Council.

In the 12th century, the neighbourhood of Santry was at the hands of Mac Gilla Mocholmog, chief of Fingal, who then established his base in Santry.

About 1170 Hugh de Lacy, Lord of Meath granted Santry to one of his most trusted lieutenants, Adam de Feypo.

In 1581 the lands and title of Santry were awarded to William Nugent who then lost it after falling out of favour with the Crown because of his religion. In 1620 the lands of Santry were confiscated from Nugent's aristocratic but Catholic offspring, the Barnewalls. The Protestant Barry family (originally from Cork) took charge of the estate and tenants and became the Lords of Santry where they remained in title for three or four generations. King Charles II made James Barry, then only a knight, Baron Barry of Santry (for services rendered).

Santry was the scene of violence in the early months of the Irish Rebellion of 1641, when a punitive expedition of Parliamentarians led by Sir Charles Coote mistakenly massacred a group of local farm labourers, who were sleeping in the fields there. Coote had assumed they were rebels preparing to attack Dublin.

In the Irish Rebellion of 1798 United Irishmen from all over Fingal marched south towards Dublin city but were met by a company of local yeomanry (government militia) from Santry village and were massacred. The bloodshed was so bad in this action that the area at the northern gateway to Santry Demesne (now near the Little Venice Restaurant) was known as "Bloody Hollows" for several years after. Later a Royal Irish Constabulary station was located on the site of the present-day restaurant.

In recent decades suburban housing estates have been built around Santry, including most recently some initially controversial developments within Santry Demesne. Hotels have also appeared.

Features

Santry Demesne (Santry Court)

Santry Demesne (also referred to as Santry Park or Santry Woods) is a demesne situated within Santry, in the administration of Fingal County Council and adjacent to Morton Stadium, the national athletics stadium. It contains a walled garden, a lake, monuments and has the Santry River going through it. The stadium was the venue for the European Cross Country Championships in 2009.

Where the new Santry Demesne public park is situated, on part of the estate lands, was once a palatial old house and gardens, built in the 18th century. This was once the largest house in north County Dublin and people travelled from far and wide to be received by the owners, the Barry family. Many hints of the house still exist and the park is worth visiting to find the house foundations, front steps, tree avenue and walled garden. A small bend in the Santry River (which forms the boundary of the park today) was widened to create a small pond for the boating pleasure of Georgian ladies and gentlemen who resided at, and visited, the house.

In 1912 King Victor Emmanuel of Italy presented the Barrys/Domvilles with a gift of 16 foreign tree species.  The house fell into disrepair, initially at the turn of the 20th century as the estate proved not to be economically viable but ultimately after the Domville family departed Ireland post-independence in 1921. It came into the possession of the State, which intended to repair it and use it as a mental asylum. This plan was shelved by the start of World War II; the need to increase security around Dublin Airport meant it was used as an army depot, and part of the gardens as a firing range. There are many theories locally about what happened next but it appears as if soldiers of the Irish army caused a fire and the house was severely damaged in 1947, followed by demolition shortly afterwards.

In 1972, part of the demense was sold to Trinity College Dublin, and was developed with sports grounds, as well as a book storage facility for its library system.

As of 2010, the walled garden was leased to a community group to run as a Community Garden; the 4-acre plot is divided into three sections an ornamental section, heritage and kitchen garden. Many varieties of plants, vegetables and fruit are grown by the 90 volunteers in the garden, since 2013 there is also a bee apiary.

A number of tree species in Santry include native trees such as oak, ash, beech and rowan, as well as the more exotic Spanish chestnuts, Californian redwood (Sequoias), Italian walnut, Lebanon cedar, Horse chestnut, Sweet chestnut, Beech, Evergreen Oak, and Chinese Pines.

Description of the house
Santry Court was an important Jacobean-type early 18th-century house of red brick and stone facings built in 1703 by Henry Barry, 3rd Baron Barry of Santry, commonly called Lord Santry. Two storeys high over an exceptionally tall basement, and with a dormered attic behind the roof parapet. The dormer windows alternated with segmental and triangular pediments. Facade was 9 bays wide on the entrance front with pedimented breakfront. The front door with segmental pediment and Corinthian columns at the top of a huge flight of steps. Originally the front door was at basement level (the door was relocated to Dublin Castle.) The parapets were partly balustraded with urns at each corner. Curved sweeps and wings were added later, probably 1740–1750. The garden front was also of 9 bays with the wings beyond. 
The house had a fine interior, a large hall, with sandstone mantlepiece, and unusually high doors, a staircase of wood with barley sugar balusters, Corinthian newels, and carved acanthus decoration (similar to those at Saunders Grove and Mount Levers). The dining room with plaster panelled walls and a plaster ceiling in low relief, mahogany door frames and dado which were a later addition. The window shutters of oak were probably original. The study was panelled in pine and had a good Adam-style mantlepiece. The morning room had very deep window seats in oak, and corner fireplace. The attic rooms were unusual insofar as the corridor was around the perimeter and the staff bedrooms internal. A domed temple (garden pavilion) was removed and is retained at Luggala, County Wicklow. A bridge over the river had balustrades and lions. After being gutted in a fire in the 20th century, the house was eventually demolished.

The Santry family
The house was built by the 3rd Lord Barry of Santry in 1703. Steps and wings were added by Henry Barry, 4th Baron Barry of Santry 1740–50, who was a member of the Hell Fire Club, and was convicted of the murder of a porter at an inn in Palmerstown in 1739. He received the death penalty but was reprieved and lost his title. After the death of Lord Barry of Santry in 1751, the estate was inherited by his uncle Sir Compton Domvile, 2nd Baronet. It remained with the Domvile family until the death in 1935 of Sir Compton Meade Domvile, 4th Baronet, when the estate passed to his nephew Sir Hugo Poë, who assumed the surname Domvile.

Swiss Cottages
The Swiss Cottages that are still associated in memory with Santry are largely no longer extant. The cottages were built in 1840 by Lady Domville who, after a visit to Switzerland, decided to build 11 Swiss-style cottages for the farm workers and estate staff. Unfortunately, 10 of the 11 cottages were demolished due to their dilapidation. While the last remaining cottage still stands in Santry, it is not in its original conception and the building was adapted into an office block in 1984 and today houses a pharmacy. Morton Stadium now stands on the site of what were the gardens at the rear of the house. The only contemporary reminder of the Swiss Cottages is found in the name of a local pub, ‘The Swiss Cottage’.
In 2019 The Swiss Cottage pub was demolished, and work commenced on a new apartment complex on the site.

Housing 
Much of modern Santry is made up of numerous housing estates, which are a mixture of private and social housing, with most estates being made up of the former. True to the area's roots, many of their names start with 'Shan', such as Shanliss, Shanowen, Shanglas, Shanboley, Shanvarna and Shangan (the latter having been encroached upon by the growing area of neighbouring Ballymun during its redevelopment). There are also estates such as Magenta, Lorcan, as well as more recent developments such as Aulden Grange, Woodlawn, Oak, Larkhill, Knightswood and the extensive apartment complexes of Northwood.

Larkhill

Dublin Corporation Housing Scheme 
By 1930, Dublin had experienced the capital of the newly independent state for roughly a decade. The citizens housing council released two reports in the 1930s that demonstrated the extent of the issue and Dublin corporation were aware that the slums weren’t being cleared as rapidly as they wished. In 1938, Dr Hernon, the city manager, disclosed a five year plan that would result in an additional 12,000 dwellings built at a cost of about £7.5m. This was said be roughly half of what had been suggested by the citizens housing council but it was believed that it was an enthusiastic target. The corporation came to the conclusion that 17,000 families needed to be relocated. The foundation of the five year plan was the assumption that, 12,000 dwellings was the maximum that could be accomplished with the resources available, and in the city managers judgment, it was impractical to commit to committing to 5,000 dwellings each year as indicated by the citizens housing council.

There were only a few smaller settlement clusters where development had already begun in places such as Larkhill, which would eventually grow into significant suburbs. The first phase of a housing programme for 1,500 homes over a five year period was proposed, with construction beginning at Cabra West, Rutland Avenue, Donnycarney, Sarsfield Road, Crumlin, Ellenfield, Larkhill and Terenure. Additional homes would be constructed to these, and schools, shops, churches, libraries, and other amenities would be made available. A £7 million total budget was planned. These ideas were important and were believed to have a significant impact on the city but there was no overarching plan in place. There was no clear vision for the city and no idea of the ideal type of urban setting. There were no agents of development other than the corporation, and no system was proposed to mediate the complicated connection between public and private actors. By 1943, Dublin corporation had only created a ‘sketch’ plan as  required by the 1934 law.

Larkhill Housing Scheme 
The Larkhill scheme was an addition to the ongoing Ellenfield project. Both were near to the upcoming Associated Properties’ Wadelai development. A total of 537 homes were to be constructed in Larkhill. The total number of dwellings built in Larkhill, which was completed 1939, was slightly higher than anticipated. Larkhill construction was relatively modest, and an independent development with straightforward access to the major thoroughfare, but local circulation was controlled to lessen through traffic. The houses that were built were a mixture of short terraces with different lengths. With the Larkhill development, it was a comparable experience. Within the confines of Larkhill Road is a development that is somewhat oblong and tear-shaped. At the peak of the Larkhill project along Glendun Road, a sizeable semicircular park was created. It was also intended to add to the construction that had already been done along Larkhill and Ellenfield.

Amenities

Retail and services
Besides several local shops, Santry contains a substantial retail facility, the 'Omni Park Shopping Centre', which also features a cinema, IMC Santry (previously called the Omniplex Cinema), and several restaurants. There is also a retail park in Northwood, Gulliver's In addition, Santry is home to the Crowne Plaza hotel, several restaurants, multiple gymnasiums, a track and field stadium, several medical facilities, a go-karting/paint-balling arena, an AIB bank, an industrial estate, a skate park, several B&B's, several pubs, an outdoor 'Astro' soccer stadium and local primary and secondary schools. Santry is just a few minutes' drive from Dublin Airport. The Santry Sports Clinic is located in Santry Demense and provides a wide range of mainly sports-related orthopaedic therapy.

Education
Santry is served by Holy Child National School (infant class boys, girls to 6th class) and Holy Child Boys National School in Larkhill, and Gaelscoil Cholmcille, and for second level: Margaret Aylward School, Whitehall House, St. Aidan's C.B.S. and Plunket College. Our Lady of Mercy College in Beaumont, Maryfield College, Rosmini, Dominican College Griffith Avenue and Trinity Comprehensive School in Ballymun would also serve some of the population of Santry.

Religion
Santry is part of the Whitehall-Larkhill-Santry Roman Catholic parish, served by the Church of the Holy Child opened in 1944, and by Blessed Margaret Ball, Church opened in 1994 (named after one of the Dublin Martyrs). The Church of Ireland community are served by St. Pappan's Church, in Santry village (the former St. Pappan's Church just off Santry Avenue in Ballymun, built in 1846 during the famine times. Workers were paid in food and the land was provided by the Domville family of Santry Woods; it is now a nursing home. This had replaced an earlier St. Pappan's Catholic Church on Santry Avenue built in 1797). There is an old graveyard beside St. Pappan's and a Parish Hall. While Blessed Margaret's was being developed the Parish Hall was used by the Catholic community for weekly mass.  At one point St. Pappan's Catholic Church in Ballymun shared seats with St. Pappan's Church of Ireland, and they moved the seats between the churches between services.

A more recent development is the Dublin Christian Life Church, in Schoolhouse Lane, a Chinese Christian community. Another new church is the Christian Fellowship Church, off Coolock Lane.

Sports

Soccer
Santry is the base of a number of sports clubs such as the association football clubs St. Kevin's Boys Club established in 1959 who play in Shanoewn Road, Ellenfield park, Albert College park, Coolgreena and off the Old Airport Road and Lorcan Celtic established in 1987 who play in Lorcan Green. Sporting Fingal F.C. played their home games at the Morton Stadium during their three seasons in the League of Ireland, from 2008 to 2011 when they disbanded.

Athletics
Clonliffe Harriers Athletic Club is based in the Morton Stadium in Santry, which they built in 1955.

Other sports
Santry TaeKwon-Do meet in Astro Park.

Trinity College has sports grounds on a former part of the Santry Demense off Santry Avenue; this includes facilities for rugby, soccer, Gaelic football, hurling and hockey pitches.

Greyhound racing and speedway
Greyhound racing and speedway took place at the Santry Sports Stadium (not to be confused with the Morton Stadium.) The greyhound racing was operational from August 1945 until 1951 and the speedway operated from 1948 until 1951.

Industrial estates
Santry has long been the location of a number of businesses and industries, from Chrysler and the Talbot factory on Shanowen Road (which became the Garda Station), to IT companies and logistic service providers associated with nearby Dublin Airport. Current businesses based here include Kellogg's.
 Airways Industrial Estate
 Furry Park Industrial Estate
 Santry Hall Industrial Estate
 Shanowen Road Business Park
 St John's Court Office Park
 Woodford Business Park

Transport
Public transport comprises a number of bus routes, operated by Dublin Bus:

1 – From Santry to Sandymount 
16 – From Ballinteer to Airport
17a – From Blanchardstown to Kilbarrack via Santry
27b – From Harristown to Eden Quay – turns away from Santry at the Santry Demesne junction
33 – From Balbriggan to Lower Abbey Street
41 – From Swords Manor to Lower Abbey Street
41b – From Rolestown to Lower Abbey Street
41c – From Swords Manor to Lower Abbey Street
104 – From Clontarf Road to DCU

Ongoing budgetary cuts to Dublin Bus mean that many services are being cancelled, shortened, merged with other pre-existing services or reduced in frequency.

The Metro North line of the planned Dublin Metro was predicted to begin operation in 2010. It was to pass through the nearby suburb of Ballymun with a planned stop near Northwood at the western end of Santry Demesne. As of January 2015, no evident construction or media announcement of Metro North can be seen, and most likely due to the economic downturn, Metro North will not be completed.

See also
Dublin University Football Club
List of towns and villages in Ireland

References

External links
https://web.archive.org/web/20050209190300/http://indigo.ie/~bdf/History2.htm
https://web.archive.org/web/20060928085048/http://www.southdublinlibraries.ie/services/local_studies/healy%20pdf%20files/x25%20Santry%20Swords%20etc%20done.pdf
http://www.santrycommunity.info

Towns and villages in Dublin (city)
Towns and villages in Fingal
Cross country running venues